The Scissionisti di Secondigliano or Amato-Pagano clan is a Camorra clan from the Secondigliano district of Naples, headed by Raffaele Amato and Cesare Pagano. They are also known as "Spagnoli" (Spaniards) because of their strong presence in Spain, particularly in Costa del Sol and Barcelona. 

After the end of the war against the Di Lauro clan, the group fell apart, starting a violent internal war. In the present day the Scissionisti di Secondigliano are known as the Amato-Pagano clan. Currently, the organization is one of the most important in the entire Camorra in terms of international drug trafficking.

History

Raffaele Amato split from the Di Lauro clan and tried to assert the Scissionisti's control over drugs and prostitution rackets in the areas, that included Secondigliano and Scampia. Amato aligned himself with several Sistema leaders, as the Camorra is known in Naples, which included Gennaro Marino and Arcangelo Abete. The war, known as the Scampia feud (Italian "faida di Scampìa"), resulted in over 100 murders in 2004 and 2005. The feud caused widespread public revulsion against the Camorra and led to a major crackdown by the authorities.

Secondigliano was historically controlled by the Di Lauro clan whereas Scampia, Casavatore, Chiaiano, Marianella, Piscinola, Giugliano and Melito is under the control of the Scissionisti.

Raffaele Imperiale, one of the most important drug traffickers of Naples, and an important affiliate of the Amato-Pagano clan, was involved in large scale cocaine trafficking from the Netherlands. In the 1990s he was a member of the Di Lauro clan, but changed sides becoming an affiliate of the Scissionisti first and of the Amato-Pagano later. Imperiale worked in Amsterdam until 2008. In 2016, two stolen Van Gogh paintings from the Van Gogh Museum in Amsterdam in 2002 were recovered in a villa near Naples, owned by him. Imperiale was sentenced to 18 years in absentia for drug offenses.

Leaders

 2004-2009 — Raffaele Amato — Arrested on April 17, 2009.
 2004-2010 — Cesare Pagano — Arrested on July 8, 2010. Serving a life sentence in prison.
 2010-2014 — Mariano Riccio — Arrested on February 4, 2014.
 2014-2017 — Rosaria Pagano — Sister of Cesare Pagano and widow of Pietro Amato, brother of Raffaele Amato. Arrested on January 17, 2017.
 2017–present — Emanuele Amato — Nephew of Raffaele Amato.

Historical allies

In addition to the faction commanded by the Amato-Pagano, other clans were most often included in the "Scissionisti di Secondigliano", such as:

Abbinante clan (Marano) -
Boss: Raffaele Abbinante, a.k.a. "Papale e Marano", brothers Antonio and Giudo, nephew Francesco (they were originally part of the Di Lauro clan, but were caught up in a 2002 sweep that jailed boss Raffaele, a former Di Lauro lieutenant. Then they aligned with the scissionisti).
Notturno clan (Scampia) - 
Boss: Raffaele Notturno and Gennaro Notturno a.k.a. "‘o sarracin" (Gennaro become a pentito and Raffaele is in jail).
Abete clan (Scampia) - 
Boss: Arcangelo Abete. (Currently serving a life sentence in prison.)
Pariante clan (Bacoli, Monte di Procida) - 
Boss: Rosario Pariante (Pariante was a former Di Lauro lieutenant, who split with the group joining the scissionisti alliance in late 2004).
Marino clan (Case Celesti, Secondigliano) - 
Boss: Gennaro Marino, a.k.a. "‘o McKay". Head of the military wing of the Scissionisti. Eventually, after the Scampia feud, the Marino clan went to war against the Scissionisti.

After the end of the feud against the Di Lauro clan, more precisely in 2012, most of the former groups that formed the "Scissionisti di Secondigliano" started a internal war, one example was the so-called "Second Scampia feud", a war waged between the Amato-Pagano clan against the Abete, Abbinante and Notturno clans.

Current status 
According to the Direzione Investigativa Antimafia, despite the arrests of important members of the organization, the Amato-Pagano clan continues to maintain the monopoly of drug trafficking and military control of the territory through extortion, having a leading role in the criminal activities in the north region of the city of Naples.

The Amato-Pagano clan had also a own faction specialized in trafficking drugs via the Eastern Europe, the group was led by Sabev Tsvetan, a Bulgarian citizen. In 2020, Tsvetan has decided to break omertà and become a pentito. According to the investigations, his collaboration would be another blow to the organization.

In popular culture 

 Gomorrah (TV series), inspired by the Di Lauro clan and in their war against the Scissionisti di Secondigliano led by Raffaele Amato.

See also

 List of members of the Camorra
 List of Camorra clans
 List of most wanted fugitives in Italy

References

Sources

Mappa della camorra: ecco chi comanda in Italia e all’estero

Camorra clans
Di Lauro clan
 
Organizations established in 2004
Organised crime groups in Spain